Zieria granulata, commonly known as the Illawarra zieria, hill zieria or hilly zieria, is a plant in the citrus family Rutaceae and is endemic to the Illawarra region of New South Wales.  It is a tall, bushy shrub distinguished by the wart-like tubercles that cover the entire plant, its linear leaflets and small white, four-petalled flowers.

Description
The branches are covered with warty tubercles and the youngest branches are covered with short, silky hairs. The edges of the leaflets have small teeth and are curved downwards. The upper surfaces are dull green, hairy at first while the lower surface in whitish and covered with soft hairs. Both surfaces are covered with tubercles.

The flowers are white and are arranged in groups of up to 180 flowers in leaf axils, each flower  in diameter.

Taxonomy and naming
Zieria granulata was first formally described in 1863 by George Bentham in Flora Australiensis, following a description by Charles Moore which had not been validly published. The specific epithet (granulata) is derived from the Latin word granum meaning "grain".

Distribution and habitat
This zieria usually grows on rocky outcrops in shallow volcanic soils. It is only found in the Shoalhaven and Kiama districts on the south coast of New South Wales.

Conservation
Zieria granulata is classified as "Endangered" under the Commonwealth Government Environment Protection and Biodiversity Conservation Act 1999 (EPBC) Act . The main threat to its survival is loss of habitat due to land clearing, quarrying, residential development and road construction.

Use in horticulture
Illawarra zieria is well known in cultivation and is hardy in well-drained soil. It prefers semi-shaded positions but will grow in full sun, is drought hardy and moderately frost hardy. Light pruning is recommended to maintain a bushy shape.

References

granulata
Sapindales of Australia
Flora of New South Wales
Plants described in 1863